The Maoist Communist Party of China (MCPC) is an underground communist party in China adhering to Marxism–Leninism–Maoism.

The MCPC was established in 2008 as a reaction to the economic reforms initiated by the ruling Communist Party of China in the 1980s. It is strongly against these reforms which have, according to the party, "restored capitalist social conditions". As such, it seeks to overthrow the "traitorous revisionist ruling bloc within the Chinese Communist Party" by initiating a "second socialist revolution" to re-establish the dictatorship of the proletariat. The ultimate objective of MCPC is to achieve communism.

Maoist activist Ma Houzhi was arrested in 2009 for organising an MCPC meeting in Chongqing. He was sentenced to ten years in prison and released in 2019.

See also 
 Chinese New Left
 Jasic Workers Solidarity Group

Notes

References 

2008 establishments in China
Banned communist parties
Banned political parties in China
Chinese New Left
Maoism in China
Communist parties in China
Far-left politics in China
Maoist parties
Political parties established in 2008